The Stedelijk Gymnasium Haarlem or the Latin School of Haarlem is a secondary school in Haarlem, Netherlands. The school was founded in 1389 and is therefore one of the oldest schools in the world. The school offers voorbereidend wetenschappelijk onderwijs (preparatory scientific education) exclusively and is an independent gymnasium enrolling 822 students and 95 teachers, for a teacher/student ratio of 8.6.

History

In 1389 a Latin school was begun north of the St. Bavochurch in the Schoolsteeg. After the Siege of Haarlem when the city council seized all Catholic possessions, the school moved in 1592 to the quarters of the old Dominican Order monastery located behind the City Hall. The current school is still located there on the Prinsenhof, that can be reached via the Jacobijnestraat. It still offers a classical curriculum, including studies in Latin and Greek.

In 1389 the city was given the privilege of appointing the rector together with the pastor of the Bavo. The rector was paid by the fees paid by students. He also took in students from outside the city and received extra fees for room and board. From his income, he paid the teachers himself. The basis for education was the artes liberales, whereby parts of the Trivium were given in Latin and the Quadrivium included music, since the choir boys needed to sing in church. For boys studying theology, Hebrew lessons were given in addition to Latin (Greek only became available from 1522). Students wanting to continue their studies, needed to leave the country before the Leiden University was founded in 1579. In 1553, when the school had been run by Junius, they even petitioned Charles V, Holy Roman Emperor for the right to found a university in Haarlem, but this was never answered. After the Satisfactie van Haarlem in 1577, the books of all the monasteries and cloisters in Haarlem were given to the Latin school and the rector Cornelis Schonaeus (1540–1611) took two weeks to draw up the inventory list. This same Schonaeus was the one who was in charge of moving the school from the schoolsteeg to the current location in 1583. He did complete a major reorganization of the school that was then placed in the hands of his successor, Theodorus Schrevelius.

During the years 1864-1875 and again from 1925–1933, the school merged with the Hogere Burger School (Haarlem), due to a decrease in enrollment.

Notable alumni
Amir Sjarifoeddin – second Prime Minister of the Indonesian Republic
Thierry Baudet – politician, academic and journalist
Hadrianus Junius (1550–1552)
Theodorus Schrevelius – humanist, writer and poet
Job Cohen – former Mayor of Amsterdam and in 2010 leader of the Labour Party (Netherlands)
Jessica Durlacher – writer
Hamengkubuwono IX – ninth Sultan of Yogyakarta
Ed Spanjaard – conductor
L.H. Wiener – writer
Jan Kops – Baptist preacher and professor agronomy at the University of Utrecht
Edward Brongersma – Dutch politician, lawyer, jurist and criminologist
Christianus Cornelius Uhlenbeck – Dutch linguist, anthropologist and writer
Jan Kruseman – Dutch jurist and president of the Court of Amsterdam
Guido van Rossum – Dutch computer programmer
Martijn Bolkestein – Dutch politician
Jochem Tinbergen - Jochem Tinbergen

See also
List of the oldest schools in the world

References

External links
Website of the Stedelijk Gymnasium Haarlem

Educational institutions established in the 14th century
Schools in Haarlem
Gymnasiums in the Netherlands
Rijksmonuments in Haarlem
1389 establishments in Europe